The Kweilin incident occurred on August 24, 1938 when a Douglas DC-2 airliner named Kweilin carrying 18 passengers and crew was shot down by Japanese aircraft in China. There were fourteen fatalities. It was the first civilian airliner in history to be shot down by hostile aircraft. The pilot was American and the crew and passengers Chinese. As it was unprecedented for a civilian aircraft to be attacked, there was international diplomatic outrage over the incident. In the United States, it helped solidify the view that Japan was morally wrong in their war against China, but the incident was not enough to spur the US into action against Japan despite Chinese entreaties. The Kweilin was rebuilt, renamed as the Chungking and destroyed by the Japanese in a second attack two years later.

Kweilin Incident

DC-2 number 32 Kweilin was owned by China National Aviation Corporation (CNAC), one of the first commercial airlines in China. It was operated under contract by Pan American pilots and management who were mostly American in 1938. The plane was on a routine civilian passenger flight from the British colony of Hong Kong to Wuchow, the first stop en route to Chungking and Chengtu in Szechwan province. The flight had fourteen passengers, plus a steward, radio operator Joe Loh, copilot Lieu Chung-chuan, and American pilot Hugh Leslie Woods.

The Kweilin left Hong Kong at 8:04am. At 8:30am, soon after entering Chinese airspace, Woods spotted eight Japanese pontoon-fitted planes in what he believed to be an attacking formation. Woods took evasive maneuvers by circling into a cloud bank and was fired upon by the Japanese planes, their intentions made clear. As the DC-2 was unarmed, Woods put it into a fast dive to find a place to make an emergency landing, but the fields were rice paddies crisscrossed with dikes. Woods saw a river and made a perfect water landing with no injuries or damage; the plane was designed to float. However, Woods soon discovered he was the only person aboard who knew how to swim and the swift current bore the plane into full view of the circling Japanese planes. They began to strafe it with machine gun fire. Woods saw an unused boat on shore and swam to retrieve it. During the swim he was repeatedly strafed with machine gun fire but was not hit. On reaching shore, he saw the plane had drifted far down river and was so riddled with bullets it was sinking with only the tail and wing still visible. After about an hour of continuous attacks the Japanese planes left. The survivors were Woods, the radio operator Joe Loh and a wounded passenger, Lou Zhaonian. The dead included two women, a five-year-old boy and a baby. One victim had been hit thirteen times.

Cause and effects

It was speculated that the reason for the attack was to assassinate Chinese President Sun Yat-sen's only son, Sun Fo, who was expected to be on the Kweilin. In fact Sun Fo had taken an earlier flight that day with a different airline, Eurasia. Sun Fo later claimed a secretary had made a mistake and had publicly announced the wrong flight. It was speculated that Sun Fo intentionally announced his departure on the wrong plane, in effect sacrificing the Kweilin so that his real flight could travel unmolested. While the Japanese government never officially acknowledged why or if they attacked the Kweilin, they said henceforth that while they took care they would not accept responsibility for civilian aircraft flying in a war zone. The Japanese Foreign Office claimed not to have fired on the aircraft but to have chased it as it was behaving suspiciously. A Japanese-language newspaper, The Hong Kong Nippo, admitted that although Sun Fo was the object of the attack, "our wild eagles intended to capture [him] alive."

Three prominent Chinese bankers were among the passengers killed in the incident. They were Hu Yun, Chairman of the Bank of Communications, General Manager of The National Commercial Bank, and Wang Yumei, an executive of the Central Bank of the Republic of China. Their deaths were a significant loss to the Chinese banking industry.

The incident was widely reported, due, in part, to its novelty as the first time a civilian airliner had ever been brought down by hostile aircraft. A popular newsreel, titled Kweilin Tragedy, showed to sell-out crowds for weeks in Hong Kong. It had an interview with Woods and showed the "mutilated airplane, scattered mail bags, and bullet-riddled corpses." After the incident, CNAC and other carriers began making night flights over China, using a new technology developed in Germany, "Lorenz", that allowed pilots to follow an auditory radio homing-beacon to the destination. There was diplomatic outrage over the incident. In the United States, it helped solidify the popular view the Japan was morally wrong in the war against China, but the incident was not enough to spur the US into action against Japan despite Chinese entreaties.

On 6 September an aircraft of the Sino-German Eurasian Aviation Company was attacked near Liuchow by Japanese fighters while flying from Hong Kong to Yunnan. The company had already stopped flights to Hankow after the Kweilin attack.

Kweilin restored as Chungking

The Kweilin was retrieved from the river bottom, re-built, and put back into service as DC-2 number 39, the Chungking.  Its former name was not advertised in order to assuage superstitious passengers who might not want to fly in an unlucky plane. On October 29, 1940, American pilot Walter "Foxie" Kent landed Chungking at the rural Changyi Airfield in Yunnan with 9 passengers and 3 crew including himself. Unknown to Kent, who was low on fuel, the airstrip had been attacked by five Japanese fighters minutes before and they were still circling nearby. The Japanese saw the DC-2 land and attacked it just as it rolled to a stop. The first bullet to enter the plane killed Kent instantly. The remaining passengers and crew tried to exit the plane but were either hit while inside or caught in the open while running across the airstrip. Nine were killed (2 crew and 7 passengers). The Chungking then burst into flames and would never fly again. Unlike the unprecedented Kweilin Incident two years earlier, attacks on commercial aircraft had become more common during the course of World War II. It received some local coverage for about a week but was not an international incident. For CNAC it was their second loss to a Japanese attack.

Chang-Kan Chien, an American-educated Chinese architect and bridge engineer who oversaw the construction of a strategic bridge on the Burma Road, was among the passengers killed on the Chungking. After his death, the Chinese government named the bridge Changgan Bridge in his honor.

Notes

Names in native languages

Reference notes

References

Further reading

North China Daily News, August 25 and September 1, 1938
Shanghai Evening Post, August 25, 1938
"Japan Again", The Manchester Guardian, August 26, 1938, published in The Chinese Mercury, Vol. 2, No. 2, New Year Number, 1939, p. 65
W. T. Woo, "Attack on C.N.A.C. Plane", South China Morning Post, August 26, 1938
H. W. G. Woodhead, "The South China Aeroplane Tragedy: International Repercussions", Shanghai Evening Post, August 27, 1938
China Weekly Review, August 27, September 3, and September 9, 1938, and September 17, 1938

External links

ASN Aircraft accident Douglas DC-2-221 32 Wangmoon – Aviation Safety Network
ASN Aircraft accident Douglas DC-2-221 39 Changyi – Aviation Safety Network
Pictures of the Kweilin recovery on Gregory Crouch's website
Hugh L. Woods at CNAC.org
Kweilin accident report at CNAC.org
Chungking affair newspaper clippings at CNAC.org

1938 in China
Military history of Japan
Second Sino-Japanese War
Pan Am
Airliner shootdown incidents
Aviation accidents and incidents in 1938
Aviation accidents and incidents in 1940
Aviation accidents and incidents in China
History of Guangdong
20th-century aircraft shootdown incidents
August 1938 events
Accidents and incidents involving the Douglas DC-2